Holy Cross High School is a school located in Kurla, a suburb of Mumbai, India. It prepares students for the Secondary School Leaving Certificate examinations conducted by the Maharashtra State Board of Secondary and Higher Secondary Education.

Management 

The school is run by the Catholic parish of Holy Cross Church, Kurla and teaches in English and Marathi. Its primary school (standards 1st to 4th) is privately run while the secondary section (5th to 10th standard) is government-aided.

Location 

Holy Cross High School is situated on Premier Road, off Lal Bahadur Shastri Marg, opposite Kohinoor city in Kurla (West), 2.5 km from Kurla railway station and 1.6 km from Vidyavihar railway station (west).This school is very close to the popular Phoenix Market City Mumbai

References

External links 
 Alumni Portal - Hosted by ex-students (registration reqd.)
 

Catholic secondary schools in India
Christian schools in Maharashtra
High schools and secondary schools in Mumbai
Educational institutions established in 1901
1901 establishments in India